The Horicon State Bank is located in Horicon, Wisconsin. In 2004, the bank was renamed Horicon Bank and the building is still used as the bank's main office today.

Description
The interior features terrazzo floors, a vault reinforced with Diebold doors and American Banking Company alarm bells. It was added to the State Register of Historic Places in 2017 and to the National Register of Historic Places in 2018.

References

Bank buildings on the National Register of Historic Places in Wisconsin
National Register of Historic Places in Dodge County, Wisconsin
Neoclassical architecture in Wisconsin
Brick buildings and structures
Commercial buildings completed in 1915